Frank Gansz (November 22, 1938 – April 27, 2009) was an American football coach whose career spanned nearly 40 years. He served as the head coach for the Kansas City Chiefs of the National Football League (NFL) from 1987 to 1988, compiling a record of 8–22–1.

Early life
A native of Altoona, Pennsylvania, Gansz graduated in 1960 from the United States Naval Academy, where he played college football as a center and linebacker.

College career
At the college level, Gansz served as an assistant at Colgate, Oklahoma State, SMU, Army, UCLA, Air Force, and Navy.

Navy, his alma mater From 1969 to 1972, although he was assistant coach and football recruiting coordinator at the Academy.

On February 20, 2008, Gansz came out of retirement to join SMU as its special teams coach under head coach June Jones, with whom he had worked in Atlanta and Detroit.

Pro career
In January 1986, Gansz was named assistant head coach and special teams coach for the Kansas City Chiefs.  He took over as head coach of the Chiefs in January 1987 after John Mackovic was fired.  In his first year, a strike-shortened season, he finished 4–11. Despite this, he was kept on as coach for the 1988 season. They proceeded to go 4–11–1.  In January 1989, Gansz was fired and replaced by Marty Schottenheimer.

Once called "the best special teams coach ever" by former NFL head coach Dick Vermeil, Gansz twice earned special teams coach of the year honors, including 1999 when he helped the St. Louis Rams to a Super Bowl victory.

He retired as an NFL coach in 2001 after coaching in the league for 24 seasons, including stops in San Francisco, Cincinnati, Philadelphia, Detroit, Atlanta and Jacksonville.

Legacy
Gansz was inducted into the Western Pennsylvania Sports Hall of Fame in 1999. In 2009, the United States Naval Academy and Southern Methodist University jointly created the Gansz Trophy which is to be awarded to the winner of any football game between the two institutions. Navy won the first four trophies, winning from 2009 to 2011 and again in 2015. The teams are currently scheduled to play every year from 2015 onwards as members of the American Athletic Conference West Division.

Personal life and death
After retirement, he lived in Atlanta, Georgia, with his wife Barbara, though he continued to speak at colleges and clinics around the country. Gansz died in Dallas on April 27, 2009, from complications following knee replacement surgery. He is interred at the United States Naval Academy Cemetery in Annapolis, Maryland. Gansz's son, Frank Jr., is the Tight Ends/Special Teams Coach for the USFL's Tampa Bay Bandits and was a special teams coach with the SMU Mustangs.

Head coaching record

References

External links
 

1938 births
2009 deaths
American football centers
American football linebackers
Air Force Falcons football coaches
Atlanta Falcons coaches
Army Black Knights football coaches
Cincinnati Bengals coaches
Colgate Raiders football coaches
Detroit Lions coaches
Jacksonville Jaguars coaches
Kansas City Chiefs coaches
Kansas City Chiefs head coaches
Navy Midshipmen football coaches
Navy Midshipmen football players
Oklahoma State Cowboys football coaches
Philadelphia Eagles coaches
St. Louis Rams coaches
San Francisco 49ers coaches
SMU Mustangs football coaches
UCLA Bruins football coaches
Sportspeople from Altoona, Pennsylvania
Coaches of American football from Pennsylvania
Players of American football from Pennsylvania
Burials at the United States Naval Academy Cemetery
Military personnel from Pennsylvania